The Women's foil event took place on October 1, 2006 at Oval Lingotto.

Draw

Finals

Top half

Section 1

Section 2

Bottom half

Section 3

Section 4

References

External links
 

World Fencing Championships
World